Des Williams (5 February 1928 – 3 May 2011) was a South African boxer. He competed in the men's flyweight event at the 1948 Summer Olympics.

References

1928 births
2011 deaths
South African male boxers
Olympic boxers of South Africa
Boxers at the 1948 Summer Olympics
Boxers from Johannesburg
Flyweight boxers